The Liga Nacional de Ascenso 2009 season (officially "Torneo Primera A 2009") started on February 28, 2009. The defending champion and Apertura winner was Río Abajo and the Clausura winner was Orión. On December 12, 2009, a grand final was played where Río Abajo were crowned champions of the Liga Nacional de Ascenso after defeating Orión 3–1. However (as it happened in the 2008 edition) Río Abajo lost the promotion play-off, but this time against Alianza in a 2–1 aggregate score, thus failing to promote to the Liga Panameña de Fútbol.

The champion was promoted directly without playing a promotion play-off.

Changes for 2009
The league increased the number of participating teams from 8 to 10.
After the Apertura I season Primera A changed its name to Liga Nacional de Ascenso.

Liga Nacional de Ascenso 2009 teams

Primera A Apertura 2009 I

Standings

Positions by round

Results table

[*] Génesis and Atlético Nacional was initially postponed to a later date. The game result is unknown however it is known that Atl. Nacional managed to beat Génesis.
[**]Millenium won by default because Genesis did not show up.

Final Round

Semifinals 1st Leg

Semifinals 2nd Leg

Final

Top Goal Scorer

Liga Nacional de Ascenso Apertura 2009 II

Standings

Results table

Positions by round

Final Round

Semifinals 1st Leg

Semifinals 2nd Leg

Final

Top Goal Scorer

Liga Nacional de Ascenso 2009 Grand Final

Grand Final

Promotion playoff

|}
Río Abajo remain in Liga Nacional de Ascenso

1st Leg

2nd Leg

2006
2
Pan
2
Pan